Richard Finch (born 29 August 1962) is an Australian boxer. He competed in the men's light middleweight event at the 1984 Summer Olympics.

References

External links
 

1962 births
Living people
Australian male boxers
Olympic boxers of Australia
Boxers at the 1984 Summer Olympics
Place of birth missing (living people)
Commonwealth Games medallists in boxing
Commonwealth Games silver medallists for Australia
Boxers at the 1986 Commonwealth Games
Light-middleweight boxers
20th-century Australian people
21st-century Australian people
Medallists at the 1986 Commonwealth Games